46–52 Tay Street is an historic row of buildings in Perth, Scotland. Believed to have been designed by local architect Andrew Heiton, the building is Category B listed, dating to 1870. Standing on Tay Street, the building has "Gowrie House" in stencilling on the southern portion of its façade, referencing where that building partially once stood.

See also
List of listed buildings in Perth, Scotland

References

1870 establishments in Scotland
Tay Street, 46-52
Category B listed buildings in Perth and Kinross